CER-203 is a central unit of early digital computer developed by Mihajlo Pupin Institute (Serbia) in 1971. It contained both central processing unit and primary memory.

Specifications
Central Processing Unit:
 Number of instructions: 32
 Performance:
 one 16-cycle instruction:  20 μs
 one single cycle instruction: 5 μs
 addition and/or subtraction of two 15-digit numbers: 20 μs

Primary memory:
 Capacity: 8 kilowords
 Speed (cycle time): 1 μs
 Complete, autonomous memory error checking
 Parity control

See also
 CER-203 computer
 CER Computers
 Mihajlo Pupin Institute
 History of computer hardware in the SFRY

Early computers